Sally Starr Engle Merry (December 1, 1944 – September 8, 2020) was an American anthropologist. She was the Silver Professor of Anthropology and Faculty Co-Director of the Center for Human Rights and Global Justice at the New York University School of Law. In the past, Merry had also been president of the American Ethnological Society, the Law and Society Association, and the Association for Political and Legal Anthropology. She served as a member of the editorial board of PoLAR: Political and Legal Anthropology Review.

Early life and education
Sally Engle was born on December 1, 1944, in Philadelphia's western suburbs to Robert F. Engle Jr. and Mary Phillips Engle. Her father worked as a research chemist for DuPont. Her mother taught French at Media Friends School and later, served as its director. Robert's family were Quakers who migrated from England to Pennsylvania in the 1600s. Mary's family had come to Philadelphia from Wales in the late 1800s, and established a successful import-export business in iron and steel. Sally was raised with twin sister, Patricia Lee Engle, and older brother Robert F. Engle III. Sally and her sister Patty attended school together and graduated with honours in 1962 from Westtown School. Then, they attended Wellesley College together. Sally majored in anthropology with in 1966 with honours and was elected to Phi Beta Kappa. She received her Master's degree at Yale University and PhD at Brandeis University.

Patricia earned a PhD from Stanford University in 1971. She earned reputation as a developmental psychologist, and later, senior advisor for UNICEF. Robert III became a distinguished economist, winning a Noble Prize for Economics in 2003.

She married Paul Henry Merry on June 4, 1967. Paul was a Harvard University graduate. They met during Sally's freshman year at Wellesley. After their marriage, they moved to San Angelo, Texas where he trained in signals intelligence in the United States Army Security Agency. He was posted to West Berlin to conduct intelligence analysis. In West Germany, Sally studied German and anthropology at the Free University of Berlin.

Career
Merry joined the faculty at New York University (NYU) in 2005 after serving as the Marion Butler McLean Professor in the History of Ideas in the Department of Anthropology at Wellesley College. Her book Human Rights and Gender Violence: Translating International Law into Local Justice received the 2010 J. I. Staley Prize. Two years later, she co-edited Governance by Indicators: Global Power through Quantification and Rankings with three other NYU professors. In 2013, Merry was the recipient of an honorary Doctor of Laws from McGill University. In 2019, she was awarded the Franz Boas prize, the highest accolade bestowed by the American Anthropological Association.

Merry died on September 8, 2020.

Publications

Books 

 1981 Urban Danger: Life in a Neighborhood of Strangers. Philadelphia, PA: Temple University Press.
 1990 Getting Justice and Getting Even: Legal Consciousness Among Working-Class Americans. Chicago, IL: University of Chicago Press.
 1993 The Possibility of Popular Justice: A Case Study of American Community Mediation. Codirigé avec Neal Milner. Ann Arbor, MI: Univ. of Michigan Press.
 2000 Colonizing Hawai'i: The Cultural Power of Law. Princeton, NJ: Princeton University Press.
 2004 Law and Empire in the Pacific: Hawai'i and Fiji. Codirigé with Donald Brenneis. School of American Research Press, Santa Fe, NM
 2006 Human Rights and Gender Violence: Translating International Law into Local Justice. Chicago: University of Chicago Press.
 2007 The Practice of Human Rights: Tracking Law Between the Global and the Local. Codirigé with Mark Goodale. Cambridge: Cambridge University Press.
 2008 Gender Violence: A Cultural Introduction. London: Blackwell.
 2016 "The Seductions of Quantification: measuring human rights, gender violence, and sex trafficking", University of Chicago Press
 2018 "Human rights: transformation in practice", co-edited with Tine Strooper, University of Pennsylvania Press

References 

1944 births
2020 deaths
New York University School of Law faculty
Yale University alumni
American women academics
American women anthropologists
Brandeis University alumni
Wellesley College alumni
Wellesley College faculty